Falculina is a genus of moths in the subfamily Stenomatinae.

Species
Falculina antitypa Meyrick, 1916
Falculina bella Duckworth, 1966
Falculina caustopis Meyrick, 1932
Falculina kasyi Duckworth, 1966
Falculina lepidota Meyrick, 1916
Falculina ochricostata Zeller, 1877

References

 
Stenomatinae
Ditrysia genera